The Astoria Formation (formerly known as the Astoria shales) is a geologic formation in Washington state & Oregon. It preserves fossils dating back to the early to middle Miocene (but was formerly thought to date to the Oligocene).

Description
The Astoria Formation is a thick marine formation representing a near shore, relatively shallow-water shelf deposit. The formation spans a considerable amount of time, with its base considered to be lower boundary of Newportian Stage (late Early Miocene) & its top to be upper boundary of Newportian Stage (middle Middle Miocene).

Fossil content

Mammals

Carnivorans

Cetaceans

Perissodactyls

Birds

Cartilaginous fish

See also

List of fossiliferous stratigraphic units in Oregon
Paleontology in Washington (state)
List of fossiliferous stratigraphic units in Washington
Paleontology in Oregon

References

 
 
 

Neogene geology of Washington (state)
Neogene geology of Oregon